The Yusuf Hamied 1702 Chair of Chemistry is one of the senior professorships at the University of Cambridge, based in the Yusuf Hamied Department of Chemistry.

History
Founded in 1702 by the university as simply 'Professor of Chemistry', it was retitled as the Professorship of Organic Chemistry in 1943, and in 1991 was renamed after a benefaction from the oil company British Petroleum. In recognition of a donation from Yusuf Hamied, in 2018 the professorship was renamed the Yusuf Hamied 1702 Chair of Chemistry.

Professors of Chemistry 

 Giovanni Francisco Vigani (1703–1713)
 John Waller (1713–1718)
 John Mickleburgh (1718–1756)
 John Hadley (1756–1764)
 Richard Watson (1764–1771)
 Isaac Pennington (1773–1793)
 William Farish (1794–1813)
 Smithson Tennant (1813–1815)
 James Cumming (1815–1861)
 George Downing Liveing (1861–1908)
 William Jackson Pope (1908–1939)

Professors of Organic Chemistry

 Alexander Robertus Todd (1944–1971)
 Ralph Alexander Raphael (1972–1988)
 Alan Rushton Battersby (1988–1992)

BP 1702 Professor of Organic Chemistry 

 Steven V. Ley (1992–2019)

Yusuf Hamied 1702 Professors of Chemistry 

 Matthew J. Gaunt (2019–)

References

 
Chemistry, Hamied, Yusuf
Faculty of Physics and Chemistry, University of Cambridge
1702 establishments in England
Chemistry, Hamied, Yusuf, Cambridge